Anopheles atropos is a species of mosquito in the family Culicidae.

References

Anopheles
Articles created by Qbugbot
Insects described in 1906